The Mike River is a river in Fiordland, New Zealand. It rises near Staircase Saddle and drains a number of small lakes, among them Lake Mike and False Lake, into Dusky Sound at Fanny Bay.

See also
List of rivers of New Zealand

References

Rivers of Fiordland